Region 2 or Region II may refer to:

 Region 2, Northwest Territories (Canadian census)
The Midwest of the US (American census)
 Former Region 2 (Johannesburg), an administrative district in Johannesburg, South Africa, from 2000 to 2006
 Antofagasta Region, Chile
 Cagayan Valley (Region II), Philippines
 ITU Region 2, consisting of the Americas
 One of the DVD regions
 One of the health regions of Canada, managed by Horizon Health Network
 One of the regions of Iran

Region name disambiguation pages